Åkersberga is a locality and the seat of Österåker Municipality, Stockholm County, Sweden with 28,033 inhabitants in 2010.

History 
In 1901 a railway station named Berga was opened on this rural spot some 30 km from Stockholm. Some shops and a post office followed. The name Berga was changed to Åkers Berga to avoid confusion with other places in Sweden named Berga, and the present name evolved from this. After World War II the village grew and blocks of flats were built. Åkersberga gradually evolved into a suburb with many of its inhabitants commuting to work-places in Stockholm, and has become more urban in character.

Between 1974 and 1982 Åkersberga was the seat of Vaxholm Municipality. When the municipality was split in 1983, Åkersberga became the seat of the reinstituted Österåker Municipality.

Notable people from Åkersberga include Loreen, Jesper Parnevik, Alexander Östlund and Richard S. Johnson. The punk rock band Coca Carola is from Åkersberga, as are the bands Lustans Lakejer and Eskobar, of which the former have released an album named Åkersberga.

Åkersberga is served by the narrow-gauge urban railway Roslagsbanan, which has four stops in the town, Österskär, Tunagård, Åkersberga Station and Åkers Runö.

Sports 
The following sports clubs are located in Åkersberga:

 IFK Österåker FK

References

External links 

Metropolitan Stockholm
Coastal cities and towns in Sweden
Municipal seats of Stockholm County
Swedish municipal seats
Populated places in Österåker Municipality